Mohamed Fawzy Noaman (born 10 July 1993) is an Egyptian professional footballer who plays as a goalkeeper for Ismaily.

Career statistics

Club

Notes

References

1993 births
Living people
Egyptian footballers
Egypt youth international footballers
Association football goalkeepers
Egyptian Premier League players
Al Ahly SC players
Tala'ea El Gaish SC players
Ghazl El Mahalla SC players
Ismaily SC players
People from Damietta Governorate